The 7th People's Choice Awards, honoring the best in popular culture for 1980, were held in 1981. They were broadcast on CBS.

Winners

Favorite All-Around Female Entertainer:
Carol Burnett

Favorite Female Musical Performer:
Pat Benatar

Favorite Male TV Performer:
Alan Alda

Favorite Male Musical Performer:
Kenny Rogers

Favorite Female Performer in a New TV Program:
Diana Canova

Favorite New TV Comedy Program:
Too Close for Comfort

Favorite Young TV Performer:
Gary Coleman

Favorite Young Motion Picture Performer:
Brooke Shields

Favorite Motion Picture:
The Empire Strikes Back

Favorite Female TV Performer:
Carol Burnett

Favorite Motion Picture Actress:
Jane Fonda,
Goldie Hawn

Favorite TV Dramatic Program:
Dallas

Favorite TV Mini-Series:
Shōgun

Favorite Song from a Motion Picture:
"9 to 5"

Favorite Male Performer in a New TV Program:
Tom Selleck

Favorite New Song:
"Lady"

Favorite All-Around Male Entertainer:
Alan Alda

Favorite Motion Picture Actor:
Clint Eastwood

Favorite New TV Dramatic Program:
Magnum, P.I.

Favorite TV Comedy Program:
M*A*S*H

References

People's Choice Awards
1980 awards
1981 in American television
1980 awards in the United States
March 1981 events in the United States